Senator DiCarlo may refer to:

Joseph DiCarlo (1936–2020), Massachusetts State Senate
Robert DiCarlo (fl. 1990s–2000s), New York State Senate